This is a list of military hospitals in Turkey.

Ankara
Ankara Gülhane Askeri Tıp Akademisi
Ankara Mevki Asker Hastanesi
Etimesgut Hava Hastanesi

Balıkesir
Balıkesir Asker Hastanesi
Edremit Asker Hastanesi

Diyarbakır
Diyarbakır Asker Hastanesi

Erzurum
Mareşal Çakmak Asker Hastanesi

Eskişehir
Eskişehir Hava Hastanesi

Istanbul
GATA Haydarpaşa Eğitim Hastanesi
Gümüşsuyu Asker Hastanesi
Kasımpaşa Deniz Hastanesi

İzmir
Güzelyalı Hava Hastanesi, Üçkuyular
İzmir Mevki Asker Hastanesi, Hatay

Kocaeli
Gölcük Deniz Hastanesi

Tekirdağ
Çorlu Asker Hastanesi

Hospitals, military in Turkey
Hospital
 Military